Slovenia competed at the 1998 Winter Paralympics in Nagano, Japan. One competitor from Slovenia won no medals and therefore did not place in the medal table.

See also 
 Slovenia at the Paralympics
 Slovenia at the 1998 Winter Olympics

References 

Slovenia at the Paralympics
1998 in Slovenian sport
Nations at the 1998 Winter Paralympics